Candidus was a "candid spirit" that accompanied the healing god Borvo in  Lusitanian and Celtic polytheism. This association is demonstrated in Nièvre at Entrains-sur-Nohain. He has been described as "a minor deity in Apollo’s train who calls to mind Apollo Virotutis ‘truth’ and Apollo's role as revealer of the truth through oracles".

References

Gaulish gods
Lusitanian gods